Anik Dutta is a Bengali film director who made his directorial debut in 2012 Bengali film Bhooter Bhabishyat. In 2012 he started working on a film on Shirshendu Mukhopadhyay's novel Aschorjo Prodip. Anik Dutta is grandson of Narendra Chandra Dutta, the founder of United Bank of India.

Filmography

Awards 
 Anandalok Awards for Best Director for Bhooter Bhabishyat
 Zee Bangla Gourav Samman Award for Best Directorial Debut for Bhooter Bhabishyat
 Zee Bangla Gourav Samman Award for Best Screenplay & Dialogue for Bhooter Bhabishyat
 West Bengal Film Journalists' Association Awards for Best Director for Borunbabur Bondhu
 Filmfare Awards East for Best Director for Borunbabur Bondhu
 Filmfare Awards East for Best Dialogue for Borunbabur Bondhu
Best Director for Aparajito (2022 film) at West Bengal Film Journalists' Association Award for Best Director 2023.

References

Notes

Citations

External links 
 

Living people
Bengali film directors
Year of birth missing (living people)
Film directors from Kolkata